William James Boyd Watson (1 January 1914 – 1979) was an English footballer who played professionally for clubs including Northampton Town, Notts County and Gillingham, for whom he made over 100 Football League appearances.

Notes

References

1914 births
1979 deaths
Sportspeople from Durham, England
Footballers from County Durham
English footballers
Association football inside forwards
St Anthony's F.C. players
Tunbridge Wells F.C. players
Bristol Rovers F.C. players
Northampton Town F.C. players
Gillingham F.C. players
Notts County F.C. players
Brighton & Hove Albion F.C. players
English Football League players
Brentford F.C. wartime guest players